Gungartan is a mountain located in the Snowy Mountains region of New South Wales, Australia.

It is located close to Whites River Hut in Kosciuszko National Park.

Many walkers climb to the peak in summer as it offers excellent views of the surrounding national park.  The overall climb to the peak is fairly easy and involves only minor scrambling close to the peak. In winter the mountain is generally snow covered and offers excellent backcountry skiing across the saddle in good conditions. In mid-winter the saddle and peak are best avoided during poor weather due to surface ice and high winds created by the funnelling effect of the valley below.

Topography

See also

List of mountains of New South Wales

References

Gungartan
Gungartan